Jandha is a village in Nilgiris district, Tamil Nadu, India. It is surrounded by mountains and greenery.

Villages in Nilgiris district